The Mnet Asian Music Award for Best Collaboration is an award presented annually by CJ E&M Pictures (Mnet). It was first awarded at the 12th Mnet Asian Music Awards ceremony held in 2010; singers Ga-in & Jo Kwon won the award for their song "We Fell in Love", and it is given in honor for the artists with the most artistic achievement in collaboration performances in the music industry.

Winners and nominees

Multiple awards 
3 awards
 Suga
2 awards
 IU

Notes

References

External links
 Mnet Asian Music Awards official website

MAMA Awards